Sinharib or Sanharib,  was according to the Hagiography of Mar Behnam, an Assyrian king who controlled Nineveh in the fourth century AD. Nineveh was at this time within the Asōristān province of the Sasanian Empire. Sinharib is generally regarded to be an anachronistically placed and Christianized version of the ancient Assyrian king Sennacherib (705–681 BC), cast in a role befitting the then Christian Assyrians so that he could still be revered.

According to the narrative in the hagiography, much like Julian the Apostate of the Roman Empire, Sinharib disliked Christianity and tried to persuade his son Behnam to reject Christianity. Although greatly influenced by the Persian Zoroastrian religion at first, he later became Christian.

See also
Sennacherib
Mar Behnam Monastery

References

External links
The Assyrian Prince Mor Behnam
 St. Behanan, his sister Sara and 40 Sahadas

History of the Assyrians
Converts to Christianity from Zoroastrianism
Christians in the Sasanian Empire